The Akhtuba; also transliterated Achtuba on some maps)  is a left distributary of the Volga in southern Russia.

The Akhtuba splits off the Volga above the city Volgograd (at ), and flows toward the Volga Delta and Caspian Sea.

The following cities lie on or near the Akhtuba: Volzhsky (at the beginning of the river), Leninsk, Znamensk, Akhtubinsk, Kharabali (within 5 kilometres of the river). The capital of the Golden Horde, Sarai Batu, was most likely located along the Akhtuba as well, not far from Kharabali.

The area between the Volga and the Akhtuba is known as the Volga-Akhtuba plain, which is one
of Russia's primary vegetable growing areas. It is particularly well known as a
major source of watermelons consumed in Russia.

References

Distributaries of Europe
Rivers of Astrakhan Oblast
Rivers of Volgograd Oblast
0Akhtuba